The regions of Ivory Coast are the second-level subdivisions of Ivory Coast. There are 31 regions, and each region is subdivided into two or more departments, the third-level division in Ivory Coast. Two to four regions are combined to make up an autonomous district, the first-level subdivision. The autonomous districts of Abidjan and Yamoussoukro are not divided into regions.

History
The first 10 regions were established in 1990. At the time, they supplanted the departments as the first-level administrative subdivisions of the country, with the departments being converted into second-level subdivisions. 
Two new regions were added in 1996.
Four new regions were added in 1997, and all the existing regions changed their names, bringing the total to 16.
In 2000, four of the regions were divided to create three more regions, bringing the total to 19.

Prior to the 2011 reorganisation of the subdivisions of Ivory Coast, the 19 regions were the first-level subdivision of the country. In the reorganisation, districts were created and replaced regions as the first-level subdivisions and the 19 regions were reorganized into 30. In 2012, one region was divided to create a 31st region.

In 2014, the districts were abolished except for Abidjan and Yamoussoukro.  Then in 2021 the former districts were reinstated as autonomous districts.

Maps of regions through the time

Governance and purpose
The executive of each region is headed by a prefect, who is appointed by the council of ministers (cabinet) of the national government. For departments that house regional capitals, the prefect of the department is the same individual as the prefect of the region, though the two offices of prefect remain distinct. The legislative body of the region is the Regional Council, which is elected and headed by a President.

The government of each region is responsible for designing and implementing programmes to improve the economic, social, and cultural life of the region. Regions are also responsible for coordinating and harmonising the activities of their departmental governments and for implementing public interest projects established by the district or the national government.

Regions
There are currently 31 regions of Ivory Coast. Two areas of the country, the autonomous districts of Abidjan and Yamoussoukro, are not divided into regions. The regions are as follows, with the date of creation in parentheses:

The 14 autonomous districts (of which two are not subdivided into regions) and the 31 regions are listed below, with their regional seats and populations at the 2014 census.

Regions before 2011 

Before a reorganization in 2011, the regions were the first-level subdivisions of Ivory Coast. The 19 regions that existed immediately prior to the reorganisation were as follows, with their creation date in parentheses:

As is the case now, regions were further divided into departments.

See also
 ISO 3166-2:CI

Bibliography
 SATO Akira (2003). "L'évolution historique de la subdivision territoriale administrative en Côte d'Ivoire" in L'administration locale en Côte d'Ivoire. Africa Research Studies 10. 日本貿易振興機構（ジェトロ）アジア経済研究所 / Institute of Developing Economies, Japan External Trade Organization (IDE-JETRO). 2003. On-line.

References

 
Subdivisions of Ivory Coast
Ivory Coast 1
Ivory Coast 1
Regions, Ivory Coast
Regions
1991 establishments in Ivory Coast
States and territories established in 1991
Ivory Coast